William James Weighell (born 28 January 1994) is an English cricketer who has played for Durham, Leicestershire and Glamorgan. He made his first-class debut in 2015. Primarily a left-handed batsman, he also bowls right-arm medium. He made his List A debut for Durham in the 2017 Royal London One-Day Cup on 27 April 2017. He made his Twenty20 debut for Durham in the 2017 NatWest t20 Blast on 7 July 2017.

Durham announced in July 2020 that Weighell would leave the club when his contract expired. Leicestershire stated on 6 August 2020, that they had signed Weighell on loan until the end of the 2020 season. He joined Glamorgan for the 2021 season.

References

External links
 

1994 births
Living people
English cricketers
Cricketers from Middlesbrough
Durham cricketers
Northumberland cricketers
Leicestershire cricketers
English cricketers of the 21st century
Glamorgan cricketers